The national languages of Seychelles are Seychellois Creole, English and French. Seychellois Creole, a French-based creole language, is by far the most commonly spoken language in the archipelago and is spoken natively by about 95% of the population. Nevertheless, the country was a British colony for over a century and a half, and the legacy of British Seychelles made English remain the main language in government and business. French was introduced before the British rule. It has remained in use largely because it is used by the Franco-Seychellois minority and is similar to Seychellois Creole.

See also 
Demographics of Seychelles
Languages of Mauritius
African French

External links 
Linguistic situation in Seychelles

References 

 
Society of Seychelles